Benito Amilcare Andrea Mussolini (29 July 188328 April 1945) was an Italian dictator and journalist who founded and led the National Fascist Party (PNF). He was Prime Minister of Italy from the March on Rome in 1922 until his deposition in 1943, as well as "Duce" of Italian fascism from the establishment of the Italian Fasces of Combat in 1919 until his summary execution in 1945 by Italian partisans. As dictator of Italy and principal founder of fascism, Mussolini inspired and supported the international spread of fascist movements during the inter-war period.

Mussolini was originally a socialist politician and a journalist at the Avanti! newspaper. In 1912, he became a member of the National Directorate of the Italian Socialist Party (PSI), but he was expelled from the PSI for advocating military intervention in World War I, in opposition to the party's stance on neutrality. In 1914, Mussolini founded a new journal, Il Popolo d'Italia, and served in the Royal Italian Army during the war until he was wounded and discharged in 1917. Mussolini denounced the PSI, his views now centering on Italian nationalism instead of socialism, and later founded the fascist movement which came to oppose egalitarianism and class conflict, instead advocating "revolutionary nationalism" transcending class lines. On 31 October 1922, following the March on Rome (28–30 October), Mussolini was appointed prime minister by King Victor Emmanuel III, becoming the youngest individual to hold the office up to that time. After removing all political opposition through his secret police and outlawing labor strikes, Mussolini and his followers consolidated power through a series of laws that transformed the nation into a one-party dictatorship. Within five years, Mussolini had established dictatorial authority by both legal and illegal means and aspired to create a totalitarian state. In 1929, Mussolini signed the Lateran Treaty with the Holy See to establish Vatican City.

Mussolini's foreign policy aimed to restore the ancient grandeur of the Roman Empire by expanding Italian colonial possessions and the fascist sphere of influence. In the 1920s, he ordered the Pacification of Libya, instructed the bombing of Corfu over an incident with Greece, established a protectorate over Albania, and incorporated the city of Fiume into the Italian state via agreements with Yugoslavia. In 1936, Ethiopia was conquered following the Second Italo-Ethiopian War and merged into Italian East Africa (AOI) with Eritrea and Somalia. In 1939, Italian forces annexed Albania. Between 1936 and 1939, Mussolini ordered the successful Italian military intervention in Spain in favor of Francisco Franco during the Spanish Civil War. Mussolini's Italy initially tried to avoid the outbreak of a second global war, sending troops at the Brenner Pass to delay Anschluss and taking part in the Stresa Front, the Lytton Report, the Treaty of Lausanne, the Four-Power Pact and the Munich Agreement. However, Italy then alienated itself from Britain and France by aligning with Germany and Japan. Germany invaded Poland on 1 September 1939, resulting in declarations of war by France and the UK and the start of World War II.

On 10 June 1940, Mussolini decided to enter the war on the Axis side. Despite initial success, the subsequent Axis collapse on multiple fronts and eventual Allied invasion of Sicily made Mussolini lose the support of the population and members of the Fascist Party. As a consequence, early on 25 July 1943, the Grand Council of Fascism passed a motion of no confidence in Mussolini; later that day King Victor Emmanuel III dismissed him as head of government and had him placed in custody, appointing Pietro Badoglio to succeed him as Prime Minister. After the king agreed to an armistice with the Allies, on 12 September 1943 Mussolini was rescued from captivity in the Gran Sasso raid by German paratroopers and Waffen-SS commandos led by Major Otto-Harald Mors. Adolf Hitler, after meeting with the rescued former dictator, then put Mussolini in charge of a puppet regime in northern Italy, the Italian Social Republic (RSI), informally known as the Salò Republic, causing a civil war.

In late April 1945, in the wake of near total defeat, Mussolini and his mistress Clara Petacci attempted to flee to Switzerland, but both were captured by Italian communist partisans and summarily executed by firing squad on 28 April 1945 near Lake Como. The bodies of Mussolini and his mistress were then taken to Milan, where they were hung upside down at a service station to publicly confirm their demise.

Early life 

Mussolini was born on 29 July 1883 in Dovia di Predappio, a small town in the province of Forlì in Romagna. Later, during the Fascist era, Predappio was dubbed "Duce's town" and Forlì was called "Duce's city", with pilgrims going to Predappio and Forlì to see the birthplace of Mussolini.

Benito Mussolini's father, Alessandro Mussolini, was a blacksmith and a socialist, while his mother, Rosa (née Maltoni), was a devout Catholic schoolteacher. Given his father's political leanings, Mussolini was named Benito after liberal Mexican president Benito Juárez, while his middle names, Andrea and Amilcare, were for Italian socialists Andrea Costa and Amilcare Cipriani. In return the mother obtained that he be baptised at birth. Benito was the eldest of his parents' three children. His siblings Arnaldo and Edvige followed.

As a young boy, Mussolini would spend some time helping his father in his smithy. Mussolini's early political views were strongly influenced by his father, who idolized 19th-century Italian nationalist figures with humanist tendencies such as Carlo Pisacane, Giuseppe Mazzini, and Giuseppe Garibaldi. His father's political outlook combined views of anarchist figures such as Carlo Cafiero and Mikhail Bakunin, the military authoritarianism of Garibaldi, and the nationalism of Mazzini. In 1902, at the anniversary of Garibaldi's death, Mussolini made a public speech in praise of the republican nationalist.

Mussolini was sent to a boarding school in Faenza run by Salesian monks. Despite being shy, he often clashed with teachers and fellow boarders due to his proud, grumpy, and violent behavior. During an argument, he injured a classmate with a penknife and was severely punished. After joining a new non-religious school in Forlimpopoli, Mussolini achieved good grades, was appreciated by his teachers despite his violent character, and qualified as an elementary schoolmaster in July 1901.

Emigration to Switzerland and military service 

In 1902, Mussolini emigrated to Switzerland, partly to avoid compulsory military service. He worked briefly as a stonemason in Geneva, Fribourg and Bern, but was unable to find a permanent job.

During this time he studied the ideas of the philosopher Friedrich Nietzsche, the sociologist Vilfredo Pareto, and the syndicalist Georges Sorel. Mussolini also later credited the Christian socialist Charles Péguy and the syndicalist Hubert Lagardelle as some of his influences. Sorel's emphasis on the need for overthrowing decadent liberal democracy and capitalism by the use of violence, direct action, the general strike and the use of neo-Machiavellian appeals to emotion, impressed Mussolini deeply.

Mussolini became active in the Italian socialist movement in Switzerland, working for the paper L'Avvenire del Lavoratore, organizing meetings, giving speeches to workers, and serving as secretary of the Italian workers' union in Lausanne. Angelica Balabanov reportedly introduced him to Vladimir Lenin, who later criticized Italian socialists for having lost Mussolini from their cause. In 1903, he was arrested by the Bernese police because of his advocacy of a violent general strike, spent two weeks in jail, and was deported to Italy. After he was released there, he returned to Switzerland. In 1904, having been arrested again in Geneva and expelled for falsifying his papers, Mussolini returned to Lausanne, where he attended the University of Lausanne's Department of Social Science, following the lessons of Vilfredo Pareto. In 1937, when he was prime minister of Italy, the University of Lausanne awarded Mussolini an honorary doctorate on the occasion of its 400th anniversary.

In December 1904, Mussolini returned to Italy to take advantage of an amnesty for desertion of the military. He had been convicted for this in absentia. Since a condition for being pardoned was serving in the army, he joined the corps of the Bersaglieri in Forlì on 30 December 1904. After serving for two years in the military (from January 1905 until September 1906), he returned to teaching.

Political journalist, intellectual and socialist 
In February 1909, Mussolini again left Italy, this time to take the job as the secretary of the labor party in the Italian-speaking city of Trento, which at the time was part of Austria-Hungary (it is now within Italy). He also did office work for the local Socialist Party, and edited its newspaper L'Avvenire del Lavoratore (The Future of the Worker). Returning to Italy, he spent a brief time in Milan, and in 1910 he returned to his hometown of Forlì, where he edited the weekly Lotta di classe (The Class Struggle).

Mussolini thought of himself as an intellectual and was considered to be well-read. He read avidly; his favorites in European philosophy included Sorel, the Italian Futurist Filippo Tommaso Marinetti, French Socialist Gustave Hervé, Italian anarchist Errico Malatesta, and German philosophers Friedrich Engels and Karl Marx, the founders of Marxism. Mussolini had taught himself French and German and translated excerpts from Nietzsche, Schopenhauer and Kant.

During this time, he published "Il Trentino veduto da un Socialista" (Italian: "Trentino as seen by a Socialist") in the radical periodical La Voce. He also wrote several essays about German literature, some stories, and one novel: L'amante del Cardinale: Claudia Particella, romanzo storico (The Cardinal's Mistress). This novel he co-wrote with Santi Corvaja, and it was published as a serial book in the Trento newspaper Il Popolo. It was released in installments from 20 January to 11 May 1910. The novel was bitterly anticlerical, and years later was withdrawn from circulation after Mussolini made a truce with the Vatican.

He had become one of Italy's most prominent socialists. In September 1911, Mussolini participated in a riot, led by socialists, against the Italian war in Libya. He bitterly denounced Italy's "imperialist war", an action that earned him a five-month jail term. After his release, he helped expel Ivanoe Bonomi and Leonida Bissolati from the Socialist Party, as they were two "revisionists" who had supported the war.

He was rewarded with the editorship of the Socialist Party newspaper Avanti! Under his leadership, its circulation soon rose from 20,000 to 100,000. John Gunther in 1940 called him "one of the best journalists alive"; Mussolini was a working reporter while preparing for the March on Rome, and wrote for the Hearst News Service until 1935. Mussolini was so familiar with Marxist literature that in his own writings he would not only quote from well-known Marxist works but also from the relatively obscure works. During this period Mussolini considered himself an "authoritarian communist" and a Marxist and he described Karl Marx as "the greatest of all theorists of socialism."

In 1913, he published Giovanni Hus, il veridico (Jan Hus, true prophet), an historical and political biography about the life and mission of the Czech ecclesiastic reformer Jan Hus and his militant followers, the Hussites. During this socialist period of his life, Mussolini sometimes used the pen name "Vero Eretico" ("sincere heretic").

Mussolini rejected egalitarianism, a core doctrine of socialism. He was influenced by Nietzsche's anti-Christian ideas and negation of God's existence. Mussolini felt that socialism had faltered, in view of the failures of Marxist determinism and social democratic reformism, and believed that Nietzsche's ideas would strengthen socialism. While associated with socialism, Mussolini's writings eventually indicated that he had abandoned Marxism and egalitarianism in favor of Nietzsche's übermensch concept and anti-egalitarianism.

Expulsion from the Italian Socialist Party 

When World War I began in August 1914, a large number of socialist parties worldwide followed the rising nationalist current and supported their country's intervention in the war. In Italy, the outbreak of the war created a surge of Italian nationalism and intervention was supported by a variety of political factions. One of the most prominent and popular Italian nationalist supporters of the war was Gabriele d'Annunzio who promoted Italian irredentism and helped sway the Italian public to support intervention in the war. The Italian Liberal Party under the leadership of Paolo Boselli promoted intervention in the war on the side of the Allies and utilized the Società Dante Alighieri to promote Italian nationalism. Italian socialists were divided on whether to support the war or oppose it. Prior to Mussolini taking a position on the war, a number of revolutionary syndicalists had announced their support of intervention, including Alceste De Ambris, Filippo Corridoni, and Angelo Oliviero Olivetti. The Italian Socialist Party decided to oppose the war after anti-militarist protestors had been killed, resulting in a general strike called Red Week.

Mussolini initially held official support for the party's decision and, in an August 1914 article, Mussolini wrote "Down with the War. We remain neutral." He saw the war as an opportunity, both for his own ambitions as well as those of socialists and Italians. He was influenced by anti-Austrian Italian nationalist sentiments, believing that the war offered Italians in Austria-Hungary the chance to liberate themselves from rule of the Habsburgs. He eventually decided to declare support for the war by appealing to the need for socialists to overthrow the Hohenzollern and Habsburg monarchies in Germany and Austria-Hungary who he said had consistently repressed socialism.

Mussolini further justified his position by denouncing the Central Powers for being reactionary powers; for pursuing imperialist designs against Belgium and Serbia as well as historically against Denmark, France, and against Italians, since hundreds of thousands of Italians were under Habsburg rule. He argued that the fall of Hohenzollern and Habsburg monarchies and the repression of "reactionary" Turkey would create conditions beneficial for the working class. While he was supportive of the Entente powers, Mussolini responded to the conservative nature of Tsarist Russia by stating that the mobilization required for the war would undermine Russia's reactionary authoritarianism and the war would bring Russia to social revolution. He said that for Italy the war would complete the process of Risorgimento by uniting the Italians in Austria-Hungary into Italy and by allowing the common people of Italy to be participating members of the Italian nation in what would be Italy's first national war. Thus he claimed that the vast social changes that the war could offer meant that it should be supported as a revolutionary war.

As Mussolini's support for the intervention solidified, he came into conflict with socialists who opposed the war. He attacked the opponents of the war and claimed that those proletarians who supported pacifism were out of step with the proletarians who had joined the rising interventionist vanguard that was preparing Italy for a revolutionary war. He began to criticize the Italian Socialist Party and socialism itself for having failed to recognize the national problems that had led to the outbreak of the war. He was expelled from the party for his support of intervention.

The following excerpts are from a police report prepared by the Inspector-General of Public Security in Milan, G. Gasti, that describe his background and his position on the First World War that resulted in his ousting from the Italian Socialist Party. The Inspector General wrote:

In his summary, the Inspector also noted:

Beginning of Fascism and service in World War I 
 
After being ousted by the Italian Socialist Party for his support of Italian intervention, Mussolini made a radical transformation, ending his support for class conflict and joining in support of revolutionary nationalism transcending class lines.  He formed the interventionist newspaper Il Popolo d'Italia and the Fascio Rivoluzionario d'Azione Internazionalista ("Revolutionary Fasces of International Action") in October 1914. His nationalist support of intervention enabled him to raise funds from Ansaldo (an armaments firm) and other companies to create Il Popolo d'Italia to convince socialists and revolutionaries to support the war. Further funding for Mussolini's Fascists during the war came from French sources, beginning in May 1915. A major source of this funding from France is believed to have been from French socialists who sent support to dissident socialists who wanted Italian intervention on France's side.

On 5 December 1914, Mussolini denounced orthodox socialism for failing to recognize that the war had made national identity and loyalty more significant than class distinction. He fully demonstrated his transformation in a speech that acknowledged the nation as an entity, a notion he had rejected prior to the war, saying:

Mussolini continued to promote the need of a revolutionary vanguard elite to lead society. He no longer advocated a proletarian vanguard, but instead a vanguard led by dynamic and revolutionary people of any social class. Though he denounced orthodox socialism and class conflict, he maintained at the time that he was a nationalist socialist and a supporter of the legacy of nationalist socialists in Italy's history, such as Giuseppe Garibaldi, Giuseppe Mazzini, and Carlo Pisacane. As for the Italian Socialist Party and its support of orthodox socialism, he claimed that his failure as a member of the party to revitalize and transform it to recognize the contemporary reality revealed the hopelessness of orthodox socialism as outdated and a failure. This perception of the failure of orthodox socialism in the light of the outbreak of World War I was not solely held by Mussolini; other pro-interventionist Italian socialists such as Filippo Corridoni and Sergio Panunzio had also denounced classical Marxism in favor of intervention.

These basic political views and principles formed the basis of Mussolini's newly formed political movement, the Fasci d'Azione Rivoluzionaria in 1914, who called themselves Fascisti (Fascists). At this time, the Fascists did not have an integrated set of policies and the movement was small, ineffective in its attempts to hold mass meetings, and was regularly harassed by government authorities and orthodox socialists. Antagonism between the interventionists, including the Fascists, versus the anti-interventionist orthodox socialists resulted in violence between the Fascists and socialists. The opposition and attacks by the anti-interventionist revolutionary socialists against the Fascists and other interventionists were so violent that even democratic socialists who opposed the war such as Anna Kuliscioff said that the Italian Socialist Party had gone too far in a campaign of silencing the freedom of speech of supporters of the war. These early hostilities between the Fascists and the revolutionary socialists shaped Mussolini's conception of the nature of Fascism in its support of political violence.

Mussolini became an ally with the irredentist politician and journalist Cesare Battisti. When World War I started, Mussolini, like many Italian nationalists, volunteered to fight. He was turned down because of his radical Socialism and told to wait for his reserve call up. He was called up on 31 August and reported for duty with his old unit, the Bersaglieri. After a two-week refresher course he was sent to Isonzo front where he took part in the Second Battle of the Isonzo, September 1915. His unit also took part in the Third Battle of the Isonzo, October 1915.

The Inspector General continued:

Mussolini's military experience is told in his work Diario di guerra. Overall, he totaled about nine months of active, front-line trench warfare. During this time, he contracted paratyphoid fever. His military exploits ended in February 1917 when he was wounded accidentally by the explosion of a mortar bomb in his trench. He was left with at least 40 shards of metal in his body and had to be evacuated from the front. He was discharged from the hospital in August 1917 and resumed his editor-in-chief position at his new paper, Il Popolo d'Italia. He wrote there positive articles about Czechoslovak Legions in Italy.

On 25 December 1915, in Treviglio, he contracted a marriage with his compatriot Rachele Guidi, who had already borne him a daughter, Edda, at Forlì in 1910. In 1915, he had a son with Ida Dalser, a woman born in Sopramonte, a village near Trento. He legally recognized this son on 11 January 1916.

Rise to power

Formation of the National Fascist Party 

By the time he returned from service in the Allied forces of World War I, very little remained of Mussolini the socialist. Indeed, he was now convinced that socialism as a doctrine had largely been a failure. In 1917 Mussolini got his start in politics with the help of a £100 weekly wage (the equivalent of £7100 ) from the British security service MI5, to keep anti-war protestors at home and to publish pro-war propaganda. This help was authorized by Sir Samuel Hoare, who was posted in Italy at a time when Britain feared the unreliability of that ally in the war, and the possibility of the anti-war movement causing factory strikes. In early 1918 Mussolini called for the emergence of a man "ruthless and energetic enough to make a clean sweep" to revive the Italian nation. Much later Mussolini said he felt by 1919 "Socialism as a doctrine was already dead; it continued to exist only as a grudge". On 23 March 1919 Mussolini re-formed the Milan fascio as the Fasci Italiani di Combattimento (Italian Combat Squad), consisting of 200 members.

The ideological basis for fascism came from a number of sources. Mussolini drew from the works of Plato, Georges Sorel, Nietzsche, and the economic ideas of Vilfredo Pareto, to develop fascism. Mussolini admired Plato's The Republic, which he often read for inspiration. The Republic expounded a number of ideas that fascism promoted, such as rule by an elite promoting the state as the ultimate end, opposition to democracy, protecting the class system and promoting class collaboration, rejection of egalitarianism, promoting the militarization of a nation by creating a class of warriors, demanding that citizens perform civic duties in the interest of the state, and utilizing state intervention in education to promote the development of warriors and future rulers of the state. Plato was an idealist, focused on achieving justice and morality, while Mussolini and fascism were realist, focused on achieving political goals.

The idea behind Mussolini's foreign policy was that of spazio vitale (vital space), a concept in Italian Fascism that was analogous to Lebensraum in German National Socialism. The concept of spazio vitale was first announced in 1919, when the entire Mediterranean, especially so-called Julian March, was redefined to make it appear a unified region that had belonged to Italy from the times of the ancient Roman province of Italia, and was claimed as Italy's exclusive sphere of influence. The right to colonize the neighboring Slovene ethnic areas and the Mediterranean, being inhabited by what were alleged to be less developed peoples, was justified on the grounds that Italy was allegedly suffering from overpopulation.

Borrowing the idea first developed by Enrico Corradini before 1914 of the natural conflict between "plutocratic" nations like Britain and "proletarian" nations like Italy, Mussolini claimed that Italy's principal problem was that "plutocratic" countries like Britain were blocking Italy from achieving the necessary spazio vitale that would let the Italian economy grow. Mussolini equated a nation's potential for economic growth with territorial size, thus in his view the problem of poverty in Italy could only be solved by winning the necessary spazio vitale.

Though biological racism was less prominent in Italian Fascism than in National Socialism, right from the start the spazio vitale concept had a strong racist undercurrent. Mussolini asserted there was a "natural law" for stronger peoples to subject and dominate "inferior" peoples such as the "barbaric" Slavic peoples of Yugoslavia. He stated in a September 1920 speech: 

In the same way, Mussolini argued that Italy was right to follow an imperialist policy in Africa because he saw all black people as "inferior" to whites. Mussolini claimed that the world was divided into a hierarchy of races (stirpe, though this was justified more on cultural than on biological grounds), and that history was nothing more than a Darwinian struggle for power and territory between various "racial masses". Mussolini saw high birthrates in Africa and Asia as a threat to the "white race" and he often asked the rhetorical question "Are the blacks and yellows at the door?" to be followed up with "Yes, they are!". Mussolini believed that the United States was doomed as the American blacks had a higher birthrate than whites, making it inevitable that the blacks would take over the United States to drag it down to their level. The very fact that Italy was suffering from overpopulation was seen as proving the cultural and spiritual vitality of the Italians, who were thus justified in seeking to colonize lands that Mussolini argued—on a historical basis—belonged to Italy anyway, which was the heir to the Roman Empire. In Mussolini's thinking, demography was destiny; nations with rising populations were nations destined to conquer; and nations with falling populations were decaying powers that deserved to die. Hence, the importance of natalism to Mussolini, since only by increasing the birth rate could Italy ensure that its future as a great power that would win its spazio vitale would be assured. By Mussolini's reckoning, the Italian population had to reach 60 million to enable Italy to fight a major war—hence his relentless demands for Italian women to have more children in order to reach that number.

Mussolini and the fascists managed to be simultaneously revolutionary and traditionalist; because this was vastly different from anything else in the political climate of the time, it is sometimes described, by some authors, as "The Third Way". The Fascisti, led by one of Mussolini's close confidants, Dino Grandi, formed armed squads of war veterans called blackshirts (or squadristi) with the goal of restoring order to the streets of Italy with a strong hand. The blackshirts clashed with communists, socialists, and anarchists at parades and demonstrations; all of these factions were also involved in clashes against each other. The Italian government rarely interfered with the blackshirts' actions, owing in part to a looming threat and widespread fear of a communist revolution. The Fascisti grew rapidly; within two years they transformed themselves into the National Fascist Party at a congress in Rome. In 1921, Mussolini won election to the Chamber of Deputies for the first time. In the meantime, from about 1911 until 1938, Mussolini had various affairs with the Jewish author and academic Margherita Sarfatti, called the "Jewish Mother of Fascism" at the time.

March on Rome 

In the night between 27 and 28 October 1922, about 30,000 Fascist blackshirts gathered in Rome to demand the resignation of liberal Prime Minister Luigi Facta and the appointment of a new Fascist government. On the morning of 28 October, King Victor Emmanuel III, who according to the Albertine Statute held the supreme military power, refused the government request to declare martial law, which led to Facta's resignation. The King then handed over power to Mussolini (who stayed in his headquarters in Milan during the talks) by asking him to form a new government. The King's controversial decision has been explained by historians as a combination of delusions and fears; Mussolini enjoyed wide support in the military and among the industrial and agrarian elites, while the King and the conservative establishment were afraid of a possible civil war and ultimately thought they could use Mussolini to restore law and order in the country, but failed to foresee the danger of a totalitarian evolution.

Appointment as Prime Minister 
As Prime Minister, the first years of Mussolini's rule were characterized by a right-wing coalition government composed of Fascists, nationalists, liberals, and two Catholic clerics from the People's Party. The Fascists made up a small minority in his original governments. Mussolini's domestic goal was the eventual establishment of a totalitarian state with himself as supreme leader (Il Duce), a message that was articulated by the Fascist newspaper Il Popolo d'Italia, which was now edited by Mussolini's brother, Arnaldo. To that end, Mussolini obtained from the legislature dictatorial powers for one year (legal under the Italian constitution of the time). He favored the complete restoration of state authority, with the integration of the Italian Fasces of Combat into the armed forces (the foundation in January 1923 of the Voluntary Militia for National Security) and the progressive identification of the party with the state. In political and social economy, he passed legislation that favored the wealthy industrial and agrarian classes (privatizations, liberalizations of rent laws and dismantlement of the unions).

In 1923, Mussolini sent Italian forces to invade Corfu during the Corfu incident. In the end, the League of Nations proved powerless, and Greece was forced to comply with Italian demands.

Acerbo Law 

In June 1923, the government passed the Acerbo Law, which transformed Italy into a single national constituency. It also granted a two-thirds majority of the seats in Parliament to the party or group of parties that received at least 25% of the votes. This law applied in the elections of 6 April 1924. The national alliance, consisting of Fascists, most of the old Liberals and others, won 64% of the vote.

Squadristi violence 
The assassination of the socialist deputy Giacomo Matteotti, who had requested that the elections be annulled because of the irregularities, provoked a momentary crisis in the Mussolini government. Mussolini ordered a cover-up, but witnesses saw the car that transported Matteotti's body parked outside Matteotti's residence, which linked Amerigo Dumini to the murder.

Mussolini later confessed that a few resolute men could have altered public opinion and started a coup that would have swept fascism away. Dumini was imprisoned for two years. On his release, Dumini allegedly told other people that Mussolini was responsible, for which he served further prison time.

The opposition parties responded weakly or were generally unresponsive. Many of the socialists, liberals, and moderates boycotted Parliament in the Aventine Secession, hoping to force Victor Emmanuel to dismiss Mussolini.

On 31 December 1924, MVSN consuls met with Mussolini and gave him an ultimatum: crush the opposition or they would do so without him. Fearing a revolt by his own militants, Mussolini decided to drop all pretense of democracy. On 3 January 1925, Mussolini made a truculent speech before the Chamber in which he took responsibility for squadristi violence (though he did not mention the assassination of Matteotti). He did not abolish the squadristi until 1927, however.

Fascist Italy

Organizational innovations 
German-American historian Konrad Jarausch has argued that Mussolini was responsible for an integrated suite of political innovations that made fascism a powerful force in Europe. First, he went beyond the vague promise of future national renewal, and proved the movement could actually seize power and operate a comprehensive government in a major country along fascist lines. Second, the movement claimed to represent the entire national community, not a fragment such as the working class or the aristocracy. He made a significant effort to include the previously alienated Catholic element. He defined public roles for the main sectors of the business community rather than allowing it to operate backstage. Third, he developed a cult of one-man leadership that focused media attention and national debate on his own personality. As a former journalist, Mussolini proved highly adept at exploiting all forms of mass media, including such new forms as motion pictures and radio. Fourth, he created a mass membership party, with free programs for young men, young women, and various other groups who could therefore be more readily mobilized and monitored. He shut down all alternative political formations and parties (but this step was not an innovation by any means). Like all dictators he made liberal use of the threat of extrajudicial violence, as well as actual violence by his Blackshirts, to frighten his opposition.

Police state 

Between 1925 and 1927, Mussolini progressively dismantled virtually all constitutional and conventional restraints on his power and built a police state. A law passed on 24 December 1925—Christmas Eve for the largely Roman Catholic country—changed Mussolini's formal title from "President of the Council of Ministers" to "Head of the Government", although he was still called "Prime Minister" by most non-Italian news sources. He was no longer responsible to Parliament and could be removed only by the King. While the Italian constitution stated that ministers were responsible only to the sovereign, in practice it had become all but impossible to govern against the express will of Parliament. The Christmas Eve law ended this practice, and also made Mussolini the only person competent to determine the body's agenda. This law transformed Mussolini's government into a de facto legal dictatorship. Local autonomy was abolished, and podestàs appointed by the Italian Senate replaced elected mayors and councils.

While Italy occupied former Austro-Hungarian areas between years 1918 and 1920, five hundred "Slav" societies (for example Sokol) and slightly smaller number of libraries ("reading rooms") had been forbidden, specifically so later with the Law on Associations (1925), the Law on Public Demonstrations (1926) and the Law on Public Order (1926)—the closure of the classical lyceum in Pisino, of the high school in Voloska (1918), and the five hundred Slovene and Croatian primary schools followed. One thousand "Slav" teachers were forcibly exiled to Sardinia and to Southern Italy.

On 7 April 1926, Mussolini survived a first assassination attempt by Violet Gibson, an Irish woman and daughter of Lord Ashbourne, who was deported after her arrest. On 31 October 1926, 15-year-old Anteo Zamboni attempted to shoot Mussolini in Bologna. Zamboni was lynched on the spot. Mussolini also survived a failed assassination attempt in Rome by anarchist Gino Lucetti, and a planned attempt by the Italian anarchist Michele Schirru, which ended with Schirru's capture and execution.

All other parties were outlawed following Zamboni's assassination attempt in 1926, though in practice Italy had been a one-party state since 1925 (with either his January speech to the Chamber or the passage of the Christmas Eve law, depending on the source). In 1928, an electoral law abolished parliamentary elections. Instead, the Grand Council of Fascism selected a single list of candidates to be approved by plebiscite. The Grand Council had been created five years earlier as a party body but was "constitutionalized" and became the highest constitutional authority in the state. On paper, the Grand Council had the power to recommend Mussolini's removal from office, and was thus theoretically the only check on his power. However, only Mussolini could summon the Grand Council and determine its agenda. To gain control of the South, especially Sicily, he appointed Cesare Mori as a Prefect of the city of Palermo, with the charge of eradicating the Sicilian Mafia at any price. In the telegram, Mussolini wrote to Mori:Mori did not hesitate to lay siege to towns, using torture, and holding women and children as hostages to oblige suspects to give themselves up. These harsh methods earned him the nickname of "Iron Prefect". In 1927, Mori's inquiries brought evidence of collusion between the Mafia and the Fascist establishment, and he was dismissed for length of service in 1929, at which time the number of murders in Palermo Province had decreased from 200 to 23. Mussolini nominated Mori as a senator, and fascist propaganda claimed that the Mafia had been defeated.

In accordance with the new electoral law, the general elections took the form of a plebiscite in which voters were presented with a single PNF-dominated list. According to official figures, the list was approved by 98.43% of voters.

The "Pacification of Libya" 

In 1919, the Italian state had brought in a series of liberal reforms in Libya that allowed education in Arabic and Berber and allowed for the possibility that the Libyans might become Italian citizens. Giuseppe Volpi, who had been appointed governor in 1921 was retained by Mussolini, and withdrew all of the measures offering equality to the Libyans. A policy of confiscating land from the Libyans to hand over to Italian colonists gave new vigor to Libyan resistance led by Omar Mukhtar, and during the ensuing "Pacification of Libya", the Fascist regime waged a genocidal campaign designed to kill as many Libyans as possible. Well over half the population of Cyrenaica were confined to 15 concentration camps by 1931 while the Royal Italian Air Force staged chemical warfare attacks against the Bedouin. On 20 June 1930, Marshal Pietro Badoglio wrote to General Rodolfo Graziani: On 3 January 1933, Mussolini told the diplomat Baron Pompei Aloisi that the French in Tunisia had made an "appalling blunder" by permitting sex between the French and the Tunisians, which he predicted would lead to the French degenerating into a nation of "half-castes", and to prevent the same thing happening to the Italians gave orders to Marshal Badoglio that miscegenation be made a crime in Libya.

Economic policy 

Mussolini launched several public construction programs and government initiatives throughout Italy to combat economic setbacks or unemployment levels. His earliest (and one of the best known) was the Battle for Wheat, by which 5,000 new farms were established and five new agricultural towns (among them Littoria and Sabaudia) on land reclaimed by draining the Pontine Marshes. In Sardinia, a model agricultural town was founded and named Mussolinia, but has long since been renamed Arborea. This town was the first of what Mussolini hoped would have been thousands of new agricultural settlements across the country. The Battle for Wheat diverted valuable resources to wheat production away from other more economically viable crops. Landowners grew wheat on unsuitable soil using all the advances of modern science, and although the wheat harvest increased, prices rose, consumption fell and high tariffs were imposed. The tariffs promoted widespread inefficiencies and the government subsidies given to farmers pushed the country further into debt.

Mussolini also initiated the "Battle for Land", a policy based on land reclamation outlined in 1928. The initiative had a mixed success; while projects such as the draining of the Pontine Marsh in 1935 for agriculture were good for propaganda purposes, provided work for the unemployed and allowed for great land owners to control subsidies, other areas in the Battle for Land were not very successful. This program was inconsistent with the Battle for Wheat (small plots of land were inappropriately allocated for large-scale wheat production), and the Pontine Marsh was lost during World War II. Fewer than 10,000 peasants resettled on the redistributed land, and peasant poverty remained high. The Battle for Land initiative was abandoned in 1940.

In 1930, in "The Doctrine of Fascism" he wrote, "The so-called crisis can only be settled by State action and within the orbit of the State." He tried to combat economic recession by introducing a "Gold for the Fatherland" initiative, encouraging the public to voluntarily donate gold jewelry to government officials in exchange for steel wristbands bearing the words "Gold for the Fatherland". Even Rachele Mussolini donated her wedding ring. The collected gold was melted down and turned into gold bars, which were then distributed to the national banks.

Government control of business was part of Mussolini's policy planning. By 1935, he claimed that three-quarters of Italian businesses were under state control. Later that year, Mussolini issued several edicts to further control the economy, e.g. forcing banks, businesses, and private citizens to surrender all foreign-issued stock and bond holdings to the Bank of Italy. In 1936, he imposed price controls. He also attempted to turn Italy into a self-sufficient autarky, instituting high barriers on trade with most countries except Germany.

In 1943, Mussolini proposed the theory of economic socialization.

Railways 
Mussolini was keen to take the credit for major public works in Italy, particularly the railway system. His reported overhauling of the railway network led to the popular saying, "Say what you like about Mussolini, he made the trains run on time." Kenneth Roberts, journalist and novelist, wrote in 1924:

In fact, the improvement in Italy's dire post-war railway system had begun before Mussolini took power. The improvement was also more apparent than real. Bergen Evans wrote in 1954:

George Seldes wrote in 1936 that although the express trains carrying tourists generally—though not always—ran on schedule, the same was not true for the smaller lines, where delays were frequent, while Ruth Ben-Ghiat has said that "they improved the lines that had a political meaning to them".

Propaganda and cult of personality 

Mussolini's foremost priority was the subjugation of the minds of the Italian people through the use of propaganda. The regime promoted a lavish cult of personality centered on the figure of Mussolini. He pretended to incarnate the new fascist Übermensch, promoting an aesthetic of exasperated Machismo that attributed to him quasi-divine capacities. At various times after 1922, Mussolini personally took over the ministries of the interior, foreign affairs, colonies, corporations, defense, and public works. Sometimes he held as many as seven departments simultaneously, as well as the premiership. He was also head of the all-powerful Fascist Party and the armed local fascist militia, the MVSN or "Blackshirts", who terrorized incipient resistance in the cities and provinces. He would later form the OVRA, an institutionalized secret police that carried official state support. In this way he succeeded in keeping power in his own hands and preventing the emergence of any rival.

Mussolini also portrayed himself as a valiant sportsman and a skilled musician. All teachers in schools and universities had to swear an oath to defend the fascist regime. Newspaper editors were all personally chosen by Mussolini, and only those in possession of a certificate of approval from the Fascist Party could practice journalism. These certificates were issued in secret; Mussolini thus skillfully created the illusion of a "free press". The trade unions were also deprived of any independence and were integrated into what was called the "corporative" system. The aim, inspired by medieval guilds and never completely achieved, was to place all Italians in various professional organizations or corporations, all under clandestine governmental control.

Large sums of money were spent on highly visible public works and on international prestige projects. These included as the Blue Riband ocean liner SS Rex; setting aeronautical records with the world's fastest seaplane, the Macchi M.C.72; and the transatlantic flying boat cruise of Italo Balbo, which was greeted with much fanfare in the United States when it landed in Chicago in 1933.

The principles of the doctrine of Fascism were laid down in an article by eminent philosopher Giovanni Gentile and Mussolini himself that appeared in 1932 in the Enciclopedia Italiana. Mussolini always portrayed himself as an intellectual, and some historians agree. Gunther called him "easily the best educated and most sophisticated of the dictators", and the only national leader of 1940 who was an intellectual. German historian Ernst Nolte said that "His command of contemporary philosophy and political literature was at least as great as that of any other contemporary European political leader."

Culture 

Nationalists in the years after World War I thought of themselves as combating the liberal and domineering institutions created by cabinets—such as those of Giovanni Giolitti, including traditional schooling. Futurism, a revolutionary cultural movement which would serve as a catalyst for Fascism, argued for "a school for physical courage and patriotism", as expressed by Filippo Tommaso Marinetti in 1919. Marinetti expressed his disdain for "the by now prehistoric and troglodyte Ancient Greek and Latin courses", arguing for their replacement with exercise modelled on those of the Arditi soldiers ("[learning] to advance on hands and knees in front of razing machine gun fire; to wait open-eyed for a crossbeam to move sideways over their heads etc."). It was in those years that the first Fascist youth wings were formed: Avanguardia Giovanile Fascista (Fascist Youth Vanguards) in 1919, and Gruppi Universitari Fascisti (Fascist University Groups) in 1922.

After the March on Rome that brought Mussolini to power, the Fascists started considering ways to politicize Italian society, with an accent on education. Mussolini assigned former ardito and deputy-secretary for Education Renato Ricci the task of "reorganizing the youth from a moral and physical point of view." Ricci sought inspiration with Robert Baden-Powell, the founder of Scouting, meeting with him in England, as well as with Bauhaus artists in Germany. The Opera Nazionale Balilla was created through Mussolini's decree of 3 April 1926, and was led by Ricci for the following eleven years. It included children between the ages of 8 and 18, grouped as the Balilla and the Avanguardisti.

According to Mussolini: "Fascist education is moral, physical, social, and military: it aims to create a complete and harmoniously developed human, a fascist one according to our views". Mussolini structured this process taking in view the emotional side of childhood: "Childhood and adolescence alike ... cannot be fed solely by concerts, theories, and abstract teaching. The truth we aim to teach them should appeal foremost to their fantasy, to their hearts, and only then to their minds".

The "educational value set through action and example" was to replace the established approaches. Fascism opposed its version of idealism to prevalent rationalism, and used the Opera Nazionale Balilla to circumvent educational tradition by imposing the collective and hierarchy, as well as Mussolini's own personality cult.

Another important constituent of the Fascist cultural policy was Catholicism. In 1929, a concordat with the Vatican was signed, ending decades of struggle between the Italian state and the papacy that dated back to the 1870 takeover of the Papal States by the House of Savoy during the unification of Italy. The Lateran Treaty, by which the Italian state was at last recognized by the Catholic Church, and the independence of Vatican City was recognized by the Italian state, were so much appreciated by the ecclesiastic hierarchy that Pope Pius XI acclaimed Mussolini as "the Man of Providence".

The 1929 treaty included a legal provision whereby the Italian government would protect the honor and dignity of the Pope by prosecuting offenders. Mussolini had had his children baptized in 1923 and himself re-baptized by a Catholic priest in 1927. After 1929, Mussolini, with his anti-communist doctrines, convinced many Catholics to actively support him.

Foreign policy 
In foreign policy, Mussolini was pragmatic and opportunistic. At the center of his vision lay the dream to forge a new Roman Empire in Africa and the Balkans, vindicating the so-called "mutilated victory" of 1918 imposed by the "plutodemocracies" (Britain and France) that betrayed the Treaty of London and usurped the supposed "natural right" of Italy to achieve supremacy in the Mediterranean basin. However, in the 1920s, given Germany's weakness, post-war reconstruction problems and the question of reparations, the situation of Europe was too unfavorable to advocate an openly revisionist approach to the Treaty of Versailles. In the 1920s, Italy's foreign policy was based on the traditional idea of Italy maintaining "equidistant" stance from all the major powers in order to exercise "determinant weight", which by whatever power Italy chose to align with would decisively change the balance of power in Europe, and the price of such an alignment would be support for Italian ambitions in Europe and Africa. In the meantime, since for Mussolini demography was destiny, he carried out relentless natalist policies designed to increase the birthrate; for example, in 1924 making advocating or giving information about contraception a criminal offense, and in 1926 ordering every Italian woman to double the number of children that they were willing to bear. For Mussolini, Italy's current population of 40 million was insufficient to fight a major war, and he needed to increase the population to at least 60 million Italians before he would be ready for war.

In his early years in power, Mussolini operated as a pragmatic statesman, trying to achieve some advantages, but never at the risk of war with Britain and France. An exception was the bombardment and occupation of Corfu in 1923, following an incident in which Italian military personnel charged by the League of Nations to settle a boundary dispute between Greece and Albania were assassinated by bandits; the nationality of the bandits remains unclear. At the time of the Corfu incident, Mussolini was prepared to go to war with Britain, and only desperate pleading by the Italian Navy leadership, who argued that the Italian Navy was no match for the British Royal Navy, persuaded Mussolini to accept a diplomatic solution. In a secret speech to the Italian military leadership in January 1925, Mussolini argued that Italy needed to win spazio vitale, and as such his ultimate goal was to join "the two shores of the Mediterranean and of the Indian Ocean into a single Italian territory". Reflecting his obsession with demography, Mussolini went on to say that Italy did not at the present possess sufficient manpower to win a war against Britain or France, and that the time for war would come sometime in the mid-1930s, when Mussolini calculated the high Italian birth rate would finally give Italy the necessary numbers to win. Subsequently, Mussolini took part in the Locarno Treaties of 1925, that guaranteed the western borders of Germany as drawn in 1919. In 1929, Mussolini ordered his Army General Staff to begin planning for aggression against France and Yugoslavia. In July 1932, Mussolini sent a message to German Defense Minister General Kurt von Schleicher, suggesting an anti-French Italo-German alliance, an offer Schleicher responded to favorably, albeit with the condition that Germany needed to rearm first. In late 1932–early 1933, Mussolini planned to launch a surprise attack against both France and Yugoslavia that was to begin in August 1933. Mussolini's planned war of 1933 was only stopped when he learned that the French Deuxième Bureau had broken the Italian military codes, and that the French, being forewarned of all the Italian plans, were well prepared for the Italian attack.

After Adolf Hitler came into power, threatening Italian interests in Austria and the Danube basin, Mussolini proposed the Four Power Pact with Britain, France and Germany in 1933. When the Austrian 'austro-fascist' Chancellor Engelbert Dollfuss with dictatorial power was assassinated on 25 July 1934 by National-Socialist supporters, Mussolini even threatened Germany with war in the event of a German invasion of Austria. Mussolini for a period of time continued strictly opposing any German attempt to obtain Anschluss and promoted the ephemeral Stresa Front against Germany in 1935.

Despite Mussolini's imprisonment for opposing the Italo-Turkish War in Africa as "nationalist delirium tremens" and "a miserable war of conquest", after the Abyssinia Crisis of 1935–1936, in the Second Italo-Ethiopian War Italy invaded Ethiopia following border incidents occasioned by Italian inclusions over the vaguely drawn border between Ethiopia and Italian Somaliland. Historians are still divided about the reasons for the attack on Ethiopia in 1935. Some Italian historians such as Franco Catalano and Giorgio Rochat argue that the invasion was an act of social imperialism, contending that the Great Depression had badly damaged Mussolini's prestige, and that he needed a foreign war to distract public opinion. Other historians such as Pietro Pastorelli have argued that the invasion was launched as part of an expansionist program to make Italy the main power in the Red Sea area and the Middle East. A middle way interpretation was offered by the American historian MacGregor Knox, who argued that the war was started for both foreign and domestic reasons, being both a part of Mussolini's long-range expansionist plans and intended to give Mussolini a foreign policy triumph that would allow him to push the Fascist system in a more radical direction at home. Italy's forces were far superior to the Abyssinian forces, especially in air power, and they were soon victorious. Emperor Haile Selassie was forced to flee the country, with Italy entering the capital city, Addis Ababa to proclaim an empire by May 1936, making Ethiopia part of Italian East Africa.

Confident of having been given free hand by French Premier Pierre Laval, and certain that the British and French would be forgiving because of his opposition to Hitler's revisionism within the Stresa front, Mussolini received with disdain the League of Nations' economic sanctions imposed on Italy by initiative of London and Paris. In Mussolini's view, the move was a typically hypocritical action carried out by decaying imperial powers that intended to prevent the natural expansion of younger and poorer nations like Italy. In fact, although France and Britain had already colonized parts of Africa, the Scramble for Africa had finished by the beginning of the twentieth century. The international mood was now against colonialist expansion and Italy's actions were condemned. Furthermore, Italy was criticized for its use of mustard gas and phosgene against its enemies and also for its zero tolerance approach to enemy guerrillas, authorized by Mussolini. Between 1936 and 1941 during operations to "pacify" Ethiopia, the Italians killed hundreds of thousands of Ethiopian civilians, and are estimated to have killed about 7% of Ethiopia's total population. Mussolini ordered Marshal Rodolfo Graziani "to initiate and systematically conduct a policy of terror and extermination against the rebels and the population in complicity with them. Without a policy of ten eyes to one, we cannot heal this wound in good time". Mussolini personally ordered Graziani to execute the entire male population over the age of 18 in one town and in one district ordered that "the prisoners, their accomplices and the uncertain will have to be executed" as part of the "gradual liquidation" of the population. Believing the Eastern Orthodox Church was inspiring Ethiopians to resist, Mussolini ordered that Orthodox priests and monks were to be targeted in revenge for guerrilla attacks. Mussolini brought in Degree Law 880, which made miscegenation a crime punishable with five years in prison as Mussolini made it absolutely clear that he did not want his soldiers and officials serving in Ethiopia to ever have sex with Ethiopian women under any circumstances as he believed that multiracial relationships made his men less likely to kill Ethiopians. Mussolini favored a policy of brutality partly because he believed the Ethiopians were not a nation because black people were too stupid to have a sense of nationality and therefore the guerrillas were just "bandits". The other reason was because Mussolini was planning on bringing millions of Italian colonists into Ethiopia and he needed to kill off much of the Ethiopian population to make room for the Italian colonists just as he had done in Libya.

The sanctions against Italy were used by Mussolini as a pretext for an alliance with Germany. In January 1936, Mussolini told the German Ambassador Ulrich von Hassell that: "If Austria were in practice to become a German satellite, he would have no objection". By recognizing Austria was within the German sphere of influence, Mussolini had removed the principal problem in Italo-German relations.

On 11 July 1936, an Austro-German treaty was signed under which Austria declared itself to be a "German state" whose foreign policy would always be aligned with Berlin, and allowed for pro-Nazis to enter the Austrian cabinet. Mussolini had applied strong pressure on the Austrian Chancellor Kurt Schuschnigg to sign the treaty in order to improve his relations with Hitler. After the sanctions against Italy ended in July 1936, the French tried hard to revive the Stresa Front, displaying what Sullivan called "an almost humiliating determination to retain Italy as an ally". In January 1937, Britain signed a "Gentleman's Agreement" with Mussolini intended to limit Italian intervention in Spain, and was seen by the British Foreign Office as the first step towards creating an Anglo-Italian alliance. In April 1938, Britain and Italy signed the Easter Accords under which Britain promised to recognise Ethiopia as Italian in exchange for Italy pulling out of the Spanish Civil War. The Foreign Office understood that it was the Spanish Civil War that was pulling Rome and Berlin closer together, and believed if Mussolini could be persuaded to disengage from Spain, then he would return to the Allied camp. To get Mussolini out of Spain, the British were prepared to pay such prices such as recognising King Victor Emmanuel III as Emperor of Ethiopia. The American historian Barry Sullivan wrote that both the British and the French very much wanted a rapprochement with Italy to undo the damage caused by the League of Nations sanctions, and that "Mussolini chose to ally with Hitler, rather than being forced…"

Reflecting the new pro-German foreign policy on 25 October 1936, Mussolini agreed to form a Rome-Berlin Axis, sanctioned by a cooperation agreement with Nazi Germany and signed in Berlin. Furthermore, the conquest of Ethiopia cost the lives of 12,000 Italians and another 4,000 to 5,000 Libyans, Eritreans, and Somalis fighting in Italian service. Mussolini believed that conquering Ethiopia would cost 4 to 6 billion lire, but the true costs of the invasion proved to be 33.5 billion lire. The economic costs of the conquest proved to be a staggering blow to the Italian budget, and seriously delayed Italian efforts at military modernization as the money that Mussolini had earmarked for military modernization was instead spent in conquering Ethiopia, something that helped to drive Mussolini towards Germany. To help cover the huge debts run up during the Ethiopian war, Mussolini devalued the lire by 40% in October 1936. Furthermore, the costs of occupying Ethiopia was to cost the Italian treasury another 21.1 billion lire between 1936 and 1940. Additionally, Italy was to lose 4,000 men killed fighting in the Spanish Civil War while Italian intervention in Spain cost Italy another 12 to 14 billion lire. In the years 1938 and 1939, the Italian government took in 39.9 billion lire in taxes while the entire Italian gross national product was 153 billion lire, which meant the Ethiopian and Spanish wars imposed economically crippling costs on Italy. Only 28% of the entire military Italian budgets between 1934 and 1939 was spent on military modernization with the rest all being consumed by Mussolini's wars, which led to a rapid decline in Italian military power. Between 1935 and 1939, Mussolini's wars cost Italy the equivalent of US$860 billion in 2022 values, a sum that was even proportionally a larger burden given that Italy was such a poor country. The 1930s were a time of rapid advances in military technology, and Sullivan wrote that Mussolini picked exactly the wrong time to fight his wars in Ethiopia and Spain. At the same time that the Italian military was falling behind the other great powers, a full scale arms race had broken out, with Germany, Britain and France spending increasingly large sums of money on their militaries as the 1930s advanced, a situation that Mussolini privately admitted seriously limited Italy's ability to fight a major war on its own, and thus required a great power ally to compensate for increasing Italian military backwardness.

From 1936 through 1939, Mussolini provided huge amounts of military support to the Nationalists in the Spanish Civil War. This active intervention on the side of Franco further distanced Italy from France and Britain. As a result, Mussolini's relationship with Adolf Hitler became closer, and he chose to accept the German annexation of Austria in 1938, followed by the dismemberment of Czechoslovakia in 1939. In May 1938, during Hitler's visit to Italy, Mussolini told the Führer that Italy and France were deadly enemies fighting on "opposite sides of the barricade" concerning the Spanish Civil War, and the Stresa Front was "dead and buried". At the Munich Conference in September 1938, Mussolini continued to pose as a moderate working for European peace, while helping Nazi Germany annex the Sudetenland. The 1936 Axis agreement with Germany was strengthened by signing the Pact of Steel on 22 May 1939, that bound together Fascist Italy and Nazi Germany in a full military alliance.

Members of TIGR, a Slovene partisan group, plotted to kill Mussolini in Kobarid in 1938, but their attempt was unsuccessful.

World War II

Gathering storm 

By the late 1930s, Mussolini's obsession with demography led him to conclude that Britain and France were finished as powers, and that it was Germany and Italy who were destined to rule Europe if for no other reason than their demographic strength. Mussolini stated his belief that declining birth rates in France were "absolutely horrifying" and that the British Empire was doomed because one-quarter of the British population was over 50. As such, Mussolini believed that an alliance with Germany was preferable to an alignment with Britain and France as it was better to be allied with the strong instead of the weak. Mussolini saw international relations as a Social Darwinian struggle between "virile" nations with high birth rates that were destined to destroy "effete" nations with low birth rates. Mussolini believed that France was a "weak and old" nation as the French weekly death rate exceeded the birthrate by 2,000, and he had no interest in an alliance with France.

Such was the extent of Mussolini's belief that it was Italy's destino to rule the Mediterranean because of Italy's high birth rate that he neglected much of the serious planning and preparations necessary for a war with the Western powers. The only arguments that held Mussolini back from full alignment with Berlin were his awareness of Italy's economic and military unpreparedness, meaning he required further time to rearm, and his desire to use the Easter Accords of April 1938 as a way of splitting Britain from France. A military alliance with Germany as opposed to the already existing looser political alliance with the Reich under the Anti-Comintern Pact (which had no military commitments) would end any chance of Britain implementing the Easter Accords. The Easter Accords in turn were intended by Mussolini to allow Italy to take on France alone by sufficiently improving Anglo-Italian relations that London would presumably remain neutral in the event of a Franco-Italian war (Mussolini had imperial designs on Tunisia, and had some support in that country). In turn, the Easter Accords were intended by Britain to win Italy away from Germany.

Count Galeazzo Ciano, Mussolini's son-in-law and foreign minister, summed up the dictator's foreign policy objectives regarding France in an entry of his diary dated 8 November 1938: Djibouti would have to be ruled in common with France; "Tunisia, with a more or less similar regime; Corsica, Italian and never Frenchified and therefore under our direct control, the border at the river Var." As for Savoy, which was not "historically or geographically Italian", Mussolini claimed that he was not interested in it. On 30 November 1938, Mussolini invited the French ambassador André François-Poncet to attend the opening of the Italian Chamber of Deputies, during which the assembled deputies, at his cue, began to demonstrate loudly against France, shouting that Italy should annex "Tunis, Nice, Corsica, Savoy!", which was followed by the deputies marching into the street carrying signs demanding that France turn over Tunisia, Savoy, and Corsica to Italy. The French premier, Édouard Daladier, promptly rejected the Italian demands for territorial concessions, and for much of the winter of 1938–39, France and Italy were on the verge of war.

In January 1939, the British prime minister, Neville Chamberlain, visited Rome, during which visit Mussolini learned that though Britain very much wanted better relations with Italy, and was prepared to make concessions, it would not sever all ties with France for the sake of an improved Anglo-Italian relationship. With that, Mussolini grew more interested in the German offer of a military alliance, which had first been made in May 1938. In February 1939, Mussolini gave a speech before the Fascist Grand Council, during which he proclaimed his belief that a state's power is "proportional to its maritime position" and that Italy was a "prisoner in the Mediterranean and the more populous and powerful Italy becomes, the more it will suffer from its imprisonment. The bars of this prison are Corsica, Tunisia, Malta, Cyprus: the sentinels of this prison are Gibraltar and Suez".

The new course was not without its critics. On 21 March 1939 during a meeting of the Fascist Grand Council, Italo Balbo accused Mussolini of "licking Hitler's boots", blasted the Duce's pro-German foreign policy as leading Italy to disaster and noted that the "opening to Britain" still existed and it was not inevitable that Italy had to ally with Germany. Though many gerarchi like Balbo were not keen on closer relations with Berlin, Mussolini's control of the foreign-policy machinery meant this dissidence counted for little. Mussolini had a leading position within the Fascist Party, but he did not totally dominate it as Balbo's attack on Mussolini for "licking Hitler's boots" and his demand that the "opening to Britain" be pursued at the meeting of the Fascist Grand Council together with what the Greek historian Aristotle Kallis called Mussolini's "relatively restrained" response show—the Nazi Party had nothing equivalent to the Fascist Grand Council and it was inconceivable that one of Hitler's gauleiters would attack him in the same way that a gerarchi like Balbo criticized Mussolini. In April 1939, Mussolini ordered the Italian invasion of Albania. Italy defeated Albania within just five days, forcing king Zog to flee and setting up a period of Albania under Italy. Until May 1939, the Axis had not been entirely official, but during that month the Pact of Steel treaty was signed outlining the "friendship and alliance" between Germany and Italy, signed by each of its foreign ministers. The Pact of Steel was an offensive and defensive military alliance, though Mussolini had signed the treaty only after receiving a promise from the Germans that there would be no war for the next three years. Italy's King Victor Emanuel III was also wary of the pact, favoring the more traditional Italian allies like France, and fearful of the implications of an offensive military alliance, which in effect meant surrendering control over questions of war and peace to Hitler.

Hitler was intent on invading Poland, though Ciano warned this would likely lead to war with the Allies. Hitler dismissed Ciano's comment, predicting instead that Britain and the other Western countries would back down, and he suggested that Italy should invade Yugoslavia. The offer was tempting to Mussolini, but at that stage a world war would be a disaster for Italy as the armaments situation from building the Italian Empire thus far was lean. Most significantly, Victor Emmanuel had demanded neutrality in the dispute. Thus when World War II in Europe began on 1 September 1939 with the German invasion of Poland eliciting the response of the United Kingdom and France declaring war on Germany, Italy did not become involved in the conflict. However, when the Germans incarcerated 183 professors from Jagiellonian University in Kraków on 6 November 1939, Mussolini personally intervened to Hitler against this action, leading to the freeing of 101 Poles.

War declared 

As World War II began, Ciano and Viscount Halifax were holding secret phone conversations. The British wanted Italy on their side against Germany as it had been in World War I. French government opinion was more geared towards action against Italy, as they were eager to attack Italy in Libya. In September 1939, France swung to the opposite extreme, offering to discuss issues with Italy, but as the French were unwilling to discuss Corsica, Nice and Savoy, Mussolini did not answer. Mussolini's Under-Secretary for War Production, Carlo Favagrossa, had estimated that Italy could not be prepared for major military operations until 1942 due to its relatively weak industrial sector compared to western Europe. In late November 1939, Adolf Hitler declared: "So long as the Duce lives, one can rest assured that Italy will seize every opportunity to achieve its imperialistic aims."

Convinced that the war would soon be over, with a German victory looking likely at that point, Mussolini decided to enter the war on the Axis side. Accordingly, Italy declared war on Britain and France on 10 June 1940. Mussolini regarded the war against Britain and France as a life-or-death struggle between opposing ideologies—fascism and the "plutocratic and reactionary
democracies of the west"—describing the war as "the struggle of the fertile and young people against the sterile people moving to the sunset; it is the struggle between two centuries and two ideas", and as a "logical development of our Revolution".

Italy joined the Germans in the Battle of France, fighting the fortified Alpine Line at the border. Just eleven days later, France and Germany signed an armistice. Included in Italian-controlled France were most of Nice and other southeastern counties. Mussolini planned to concentrate Italian forces on a major offensive against the British Empire in Africa and the Middle East, known as the "parallel war", while expecting the collapse of the UK in the European theatre. The Italians invaded Egypt, bombed Mandatory Palestine, and attacked the British in their Sudan, Kenya and British Somaliland colonies (in what would become known as the East African Campaign); British Somaliland was conquered and became part of Italian East Africa on 3 August 1940, and there were Italian advances in the Sudan and Kenya with initial success. The British government refused to accept proposals for a peace that would involve accepting Axis victories in Europe; plans for an invasion of the UK did not proceed and the war continued.

Path to defeat 

In September 1940, the Italian Tenth Army was commanded by General Rodolfo Graziani and crossed from Italian Libya into Egypt, where British forces were located; this would become the Western Desert Campaign. Advances were successful, but the Italians stopped at Sidi Barrani waiting for logistic supplies to catch up. On 24 October 1940, Mussolini sent the Italian Air Corps to Belgium, where it took part in the Blitz until January 1941. In October, Mussolini also sent Italian forces into Greece, starting the Greco-Italian War. The Royal Air Force prevented the Italian invasion and allowed the Greeks to push the Italians back to Albania, but the Greek counter-offensive in Italian Albania ended in a stalemate.

Events in Africa had changed by early 1941 as Operation Compass had forced the Italians back into Libya, causing high losses in the Italian Army. Also in the East African Campaign, an attack was mounted against Italian forces. Despite putting up some resistance, they were overwhelmed at the Battle of Keren, and the Italian defense started to crumble with a final defeat in the Battle of Gondar. When addressing the Italian public on the events, Mussolini was completely open about the situation, saying "We call bread bread and wine wine, and when the enemy wins a battle it is useless and ridiculous to seek, as the English do in their incomparable hypocrisy, to deny or diminish it." With the Axis invasion of Yugoslavia and the Balkans, Italy annexed Ljubljana, Dalmatia and Montenegro, and established the puppet states of Croatia and the Hellenic State.

General Mario Robotti, Commander of the Italian 11th division in Slovenia and Croatia, issued an order in line with a directive received from Mussolini in June 1942: "I would not be opposed to all (sic) Slovenes being imprisoned and replaced by Italians. In other words, we should take steps to ensure that political and ethnic frontiers coincide".

Mussolini first learned of Operation Barbarossa after the invasion of the Soviet Union had begun on 22 June 1941, and was not asked by Hitler to involve himself. On 25 June 1941, he inspected the first units at Verona, which served as his launching pad to Russia. Mussolini told the Council of Ministers of 5 July that his only worry was that Germany might defeat the Soviet Union before the Italians arrived. At a meeting with Hitler in August, Mussolini offered and Hitler accepted the commitment of further Italian troops to fight the Soviet Union. The heavy losses suffered by the Italians on the Eastern Front, where service was extremely unpopular owing to the widespread view that this was not Italy's fight, did much to damage Mussolini's prestige with the Italian people. After the Japanese attack on Pearl Harbor, he declared war on the United States on 11 December 1941. A piece of evidence regarding Mussolini's response to the attack on Pearl Harbor comes from the diary of his Foreign Minister Ciano:

Following Vichy France's collapse and the Case Anton, Italy occupied the French territories of Corsica and Tunisia. Italian forces had also achieved victories against insurgents in Yugoslavia and in Montenegro, and Italo-German forces had occupied parts of British-held Egypt on their push to El-Alamein after their victory at Gazala.

Although Mussolini was aware that Italy, whose resources were reduced by the campaigns of the 1930s, was not ready for a long war, he opted to remain in the conflict to not abandon the occupied territories and the fascist imperial ambitions.

Dismissed and arrested 

By 1943, Italy's military position had become untenable. Axis forces in North Africa were finally defeated in the Tunisia Campaign in early 1943. Italy suffered major setbacks on the Eastern Front as well. The Allied invasion of Sicily brought the war to the nation's very doorstep. The Italian home front was also in bad shape as the Allied bombings were taking their toll. Factories all over Italy were brought to a virtual standstill because raw materials, such as coal and oil, were lacking. Additionally, there was a chronic shortage of food, and what food was available was being sold at nearly confiscatory prices. Mussolini's once-ubiquitous propaganda machine lost its grip on the people; a large number of Italians turned to Vatican Radio or Radio London for more accurate news coverage. Discontent came to a head in March 1943 with a wave of labor strikes in the industrial north—the first large-scale strikes since 1925. Also in March, some of the major factories in Milan and Turin stopped production to secure evacuation allowances for workers' families. The German presence in Italy had sharply turned public opinion against Mussolini; for example, when the Allies invaded Sicily, the majority of the public there welcomed them as liberators.

Mussolini feared that with Allied victory in North Africa, Allied armies would come across the Mediterranean and attack Italy. In April 1943, as the Allies closed into Tunisia, Mussolini had urged Hitler to make a separate peace with the USSR and send German troops to the west to guard against an expected Allied invasion of Italy. The Allies landed in Sicily on 10 July 1943, and within a few days it was obvious the Italian army was on the brink of collapse. This led Hitler to summon Mussolini to a meeting in Feltre on 19 July 1943. By this time, Mussolini was so shaken from stress that he could no longer stand Hitler's boasting. His mood darkened further when that same day, the Allies bombed Rome—the first time that city had ever been the target of enemy bombing. It was obvious by this time that the war was lost, but Mussolini could not extricate himself from the German alliance.

By this point, some prominent members of Mussolini's government had turned against him. Among them were Grandi and Ciano. Several of his colleagues were close to revolt, and Mussolini was forced to summon the Grand Council on 24 July 1943. This was the first time the body had met since the start of the war. When he announced that the Germans were thinking of evacuating the south, Grandi launched a blistering attack on him. Grandi moved a resolution asking the king to resume his full constitutional powers—in effect, a vote of no confidence in Mussolini. This motion carried by a 19–8 margin. Mussolini showed little visible reaction, even though this effectively authorized the king to sack him. He did, however, ask Grandi to consider the possibility that this motion would spell the end of Fascism. The vote, although significant, had no de jure effect, since the prime minister was only responsible to the king.

Despite this sharp rebuke, Mussolini showed up for work the next day as usual. He allegedly viewed the Grand Council as merely an advisory body and did not think the vote would have any substantive effect. That afternoon, at 17:00, he was summoned to the royal palace by Victor Emmanuel. By then, Victor Emmanel had already decided to sack him; the king had arranged an escort for Mussolini and had the government building surrounded by 200 carabinieri. Mussolini was unaware of these moves by the king and tried to tell him about the Grand Council meeting. Victor Emmanuel cut him off and formally dismissed him from office, although guaranteeing his immunity. After Mussolini left the palace, he was arrested by the carabinieri on the king's orders. The police took Mussolini in a Red Cross ambulance car, without specifying his destination and assuring him that they were doing it for his own safety. By this time, discontent with Mussolini was so intense that when the news of his downfall was announced on the radio, there was no resistance of any sort. People rejoiced because they believed that the end of Mussolini also meant the end of the war. The king appointed Marshal Pietro Badoglio as the new prime minister.

In an effort to conceal his location from the Germans, Mussolini was moved around: first to Ponza, then to La Maddalena, before being imprisoned at Campo Imperatore, a mountain resort in Abruzzo where he was completely isolated. Badoglio kept up the appearance of loyalty to Germany, and announced that Italy would continue fighting on the side of the Axis. However, he dissolved the Fascist Party two days after taking over and began negotiating with the Allies. On 3 September 1943, Badoglio agreed to an Armistice between Italy and Allied armed forces. Its announcement five days later threw Italy into chaos; German troops seized control in Operation Achse. As the Germans approached Rome, Badoglio and the king fled with their main collaborators to Apulia, putting themselves under the protection of the Allies, but leaving the Italian Army without orders. After a period of anarchy, they formed a government in Malta, and finally declared war on Germany on 13 October 1943. Several thousand Italian troops joined the Allies to fight against the Germans; most others deserted or surrendered to the Germans; some refused to switch sides and joined the Germans. The Badoglio government agreed to a political truce with the predominantly leftist Partisans for the sake of Italy and to rid the land of the Nazis.

Italian Social Republic ("Salò Republic") 

Only two months after Mussolini had been dismissed and arrested, he was rescued from his prison at the Hotel Campo Imperatore in the Gran Sasso raid on 12 September 1943 by a special Fallschirmjäger (paratroopers) unit and Waffen-SS commandos led by Major Otto-Harald Mors; Otto Skorzeny was also present. The rescue saved Mussolini from being turned over to the Allies in accordance with the armistice. Hitler had made plans to arrest the king, the Crown Prince Umberto, Badoglio, and the rest of the government and restore Mussolini to power in Rome, but the government's escape south likely foiled those plans.

Three days after his rescue in the Gran Sasso raid, Mussolini was taken to Germany for a meeting with Hitler in Rastenburg at his East Prussian headquarters. Despite his public support, Hitler was clearly shocked by Mussolini's disheveled and haggard appearance as well as his unwillingness to go after the men in Rome who overthrew him. Feeling that he had to do what he could to blunt the edges of Nazi repression, Mussolini agreed to set up a new regime, the Italian Social Republic (RSI), informally known as the Salò Republic because of its seat in the town of Salò where he was settled 11 days after his rescue by the Germans. Mussolini's new regime faced numerous territorial losses: in addition to losing the Italian lands held by the Allies and Badoglio's government, the provinces of Bolzano, Belluno and Trento were placed under German administration in the Operational Zone of the Alpine Foothills, while the provinces of Udine, Gorizia, Trieste, Pola (now Pula), Fiume (now Rijeka), and Ljubljana (Lubiana in Italian) were incorporated into the German Operational Zone of the Adriatic Littoral.

In addition, the German army occupied the Dalmatian provinces of Split (Spalato) and Kotor (Cattaro), which were subsequently annexed by the Croatian fascist regime. Italy's gains in Greece and Albania were also lost to Germany, with the exception of the Italian Islands of the Aegean, which remained nominally under RSI rule. Mussolini opposed any territorial reductions of the Italian state and told his associates:

For about a year and a half, Mussolini lived in Gargnano on Lake Garda in Lombardy. Although he insisted in public that he was in full control, he knew he was a puppet ruler under the protection of his German liberators—for all intents and purposes, the Gauleiter of Lombardy. Indeed, he lived under what amounted to house arrest by the SS, who restricted his communications and travel. He told one of his colleagues that being sent to a concentration camp was preferable to this status.

Yielding to pressure from Hitler and the remaining loyal fascists who formed the government of the Republic of Salò, Mussolini helped orchestrate a series of executions of some of the leaders who had betrayed him at the last meeting of the Fascist Grand Council. One of those executed was his son-in-law, Galeazzo Ciano. As head of state and Minister of Foreign Affairs for the Italian Social Republic, Mussolini used much of his time to write his memoirs. Along with his autobiographical writings of 1928, these writings would be combined and published by Da Capo Press as My Rise and Fall. In an interview in January 1945 by Madeleine Mollier, a few months before he was captured and executed by Italian partisans, he stated flatly: "Seven years ago, I was an interesting person. Now, I am little more than a corpse." He continued:

Death

On 25 April 1945, Allied troops were advancing into northern Italy, and the collapse of the Salò Republic was imminent. Mussolini and his mistress Clara Petacci set out for Switzerland, intending to board a plane and escape to Spain. Two days later on 27 April, they were stopped near the village of Dongo (Lake Como) by communist partisans named Valerio and Bellini and identified by the Political Commissar of the partisans' 52nd Garibaldi Brigade, Urbano Lazzaro. During this time, Petacci's brother posed as a Spanish consul.

With the spread of the news of the arrest, several telegrams arrived at the command of the National Liberation Committee for Northern Italy (CLNAI) from the Office of Strategic Services (OSS) headquarters in Siena with the request that Mussolini be entrusted to the control of the United Nations forces. In fact, clause number 29 of the armistice signed in Malta by Eisenhower and the Marshal of Italy Pietro Badoglio on 29 September 1943, expressly provided that: "Benito Mussolini, his main fascist associates and all persons suspected of having committed crimes of war or similar crimes, whose names are on the lists that will be delivered by the United Nations and which now or in the future are in territory controlled by the allied military command or by the Italian government, will be immediately arrested and handed over to the United Nations forces".

The next day, Mussolini and Petacci were both summarily shot, along with most of the members of their 15-man train, primarily ministers and officials of the Italian Social Republic. The shootings took place in the small village of Giulino di Mezzegra and were conducted by a partisan leader who used the nom de guerre Colonnello Valerio. His real identity is unknown, but conventionally he is thought to have been Walter Audisio, who always claimed to have carried out the execution, though another partisan controversially alleged that Colonnello Valerio was Luigi Longo, subsequently a leading communist politician in post-war Italy.

Mussolini's corpse
On 29 April 1945, the bodies of Mussolini, Petacci, and the other executed Fascists were loaded into a van and moved south to Milan. At 3:00 a.m., the corpses were dumped on the ground in the old Piazzale Loreto. The piazza had been renamed "Piazza Quindici Martiri" (Fifteen Martyrs' Square) in honor of fifteen Italian partisans recently executed there.

After being kicked and spat upon, the bodies were hung upside down from the roof of an Esso gas station.  The bodies were then stoned from below by civilians. This was done both to discourage any Fascists from continuing the fight, and as an act of revenge for the hanging of many partisans in the same place by Axis authorities. The corpse of the deposed leader was subject to ridicule and abuse. Fascist loyalist Achille Starace was captured and sentenced to death and then taken to the Piazzale Loreto and shown the body of Mussolini, which he saluted just before being shot. His body was strung up beside Mussolini's. Starace once said of Mussolini "He is a god".

Personal life 
Mussolini's first wife was Ida Dalser, whom he married in Trento in 1914. The couple had a son the following year and named him Benito Albino Mussolini (1915–1942). In December 1915, Mussolini married Rachele Guidi, who had been his mistress since 1910. Due to his upcoming political ascendency, the information about his first marriage was suppressed, and both his first wife and son were later persecuted. With Rachele, Mussolini had two daughters, Edda (1910–1995) and Anna Maria (1929–1968), the latter of whom married in Ravenna on 11 June 1960 to Nando Pucci Negri; and three sons: Vittorio (1916–1997), Bruno (1918–1941) and Romano (1927–2006). Mussolini had several mistresses, among them Margherita Sarfatti and his final companion, Clara Petacci. Mussolini had many brief sexual encounters with female supporters, as reported by his biographer Nicholas Farrell.

Imprisonment may have been the cause of Mussolini's claustrophobia. He refused to enter the Blue Grotto (a sea cave on the coast of Capri), and preferred large rooms like his  office at the Palazzo Venezia.

In addition to his native Italian, Mussolini spoke English, French and questionable German (his sense of pride meant he did not use a German interpreter). This was notable at the Munich Conference, as no other national leader spoke anything other than his native language; Mussolini was described as effectively being the "chief interpreter" at the Conference.

Religious views

Atheism and anti-clericalism 
Mussolini was raised by a devoutly Catholic mother and an anti-clerical father. His mother Rosa had him baptized into the Roman Catholic Church, and took her children to services every Sunday. His father never attended. Mussolini regarded his time at a religious boarding school as punishment, compared the experience to hell, and "once refused to go to morning Mass and had to be dragged there by force."

Mussolini became anti-clerical like his father. As a young man, he "proclaimed himself to be an atheist and several times tried to shock an audience by calling on God to strike him dead." He believed that science had proven there was no god, and that the historical Jesus was ignorant and mad. He considered religion a disease of the psyche, and accused Christianity of promoting resignation and cowardice. Mussolini was superstitious; after hearing of the curse of the Pharaohs, he ordered the immediate removal from the Palazzo Chigi of an Egyptian mummy he had accepted as a gift.

Mussolini was an admirer of Friedrich Nietzsche. According to Denis Mack Smith, "In Nietzsche he found justification for his crusade against the Christian virtues of humility, resignation, charity, and goodness." He valued Nietzsche's concept of the superman, "The supreme egoist who defied both God and the masses, who despised egalitarianism and democracy, who believed in the weakest going to the wall and pushing them if they did not go fast enough." On his 60th birthday, Mussolini received a gift from Hitler of a complete twenty-four volume set of the works of Nietzsche.

Mussolini made vitriolic attacks against Christianity and the Catholic Church, which he accompanied with provocative remarks about the consecrated host, and about a love affair between Christ and Mary Magdalene. He denounced socialists who were tolerant of religion, or who had their children baptized, and called for socialists who accepted religious marriage to be expelled from the party. He denounced the Catholic Church for "its authoritarianism and refusal to allow freedom of thought ..." Mussolini's newspaper, La Lotta di Classe, reportedly had an anti-Christian editorial stance. Mussolini once attended meetings held by a Methodist minister in a Protestant chapel where he debated the existence of God.

Lateran Treaty 

Despite making such attacks, Mussolini tried to win popular support by appeasing the Catholic majority in Italy. In 1924, Mussolini saw that three of his children were given communion. In 1925, he had a priest perform a religious marriage ceremony for himself and his wife Rachele, whom he had married in a civil ceremony 10 years earlier. On 11 February 1929, he signed a concordat and treaty with the Roman Catholic Church. Under the Lateran Pact, Vatican City was granted independent statehood and placed under Church law—rather than Italian law—and the Catholic religion was recognized as Italy's state religion. The Church also regained authority over marriage, Catholicism could be taught in all secondary schools, birth control and freemasonry were banned, and the clergy received subsidies from the state and was exempted from taxation. Pope Pius XI praised Mussolini, and the official Catholic newspaper pronounced "Italy has been given back to God and God to Italy."

After this conciliation, he claimed the Church was subordinate to the State, and "referred to Catholicism as, in origin, a minor sect that had spread beyond Palestine only because grafted onto the organization of the Roman empire." After the concordat, "he confiscated more issues of Catholic newspapers in the next three months than in the previous seven years." Mussolini reportedly came close to being excommunicated from the Catholic Church around this time.

Mussolini publicly reconciled with the Pope Pius XI in 1932, but "took care to exclude from the newspapers any photography of himself kneeling or showing deference to the Pope." He wanted to persuade Catholics that "[f]ascism was Catholic and he himself a believer who spent some of each day in prayer ..." The Pope began referring to Mussolini as "a man sent by Providence." Despite Mussolini's efforts to appear pious, by order of his party, pronouns referring to him "had to be capitalized like those referring to God ..."

In 1938 Mussolini began reasserting his anti-clericalism. He would sometimes refer to himself as an "outright disbeliever", and once told his cabinet that "Islam was perhaps a more effective religion than Christianity" and that the "papacy was a malignant tumor in the body of Italy and must 'be rooted out once and for all', because there was no room in Rome for both the Pope and himself." He publicly backed down from these anti-clerical statements, but continued making similar statements in private.

After his fall from power in 1943, Mussolini began speaking "more about God and the obligations of conscience", although "he still had little use for the priests and sacraments of the Church". He also began drawing parallels between himself and Jesus Christ. Mussolini's widow, Rachele, stated that her husband had remained "basically irreligious until the later years of his life". Mussolini was given a funeral in 1957 when his remains were placed in the family crypt.

Mussolini's views on antisemitism and race 

Over the span of his career, Mussolini's views and policies regarding Jews and Anti-Semitism were often inconsistent, contradictory, and radically shifted depending on the situation. Most historians have generally labeled him as a political opportunist when it came to the treatment of the Jews rather than following a sincere belief. Mussolini considered Italian Jews to be Italians, but this belief may have been influenced more by his Anti-Clericalism and the general mood of Italy at the time, which denounced the abusive treatment of the Jews in the Roman Ghetto by the Papal States until the Unification of Italy. Although Mussolini had initially disregarded biological racism, he was a firm believer in national traits and made several generalizations about Jews. Mussolini blamed the Russian Revolution of 1917 on "Jewish vengeance" against Christianity with the remark "Race does not betray race ... Bolshevism is being defended by the international plutocracy. That is the real truth." He also made an assertion that 80% of Soviet leaders were Jewish. Yet, within a few weeks, he contradicted himself with the remark "Bolshevism is not, as people believe, a Jewish phenomenon. The truth is that Bolshevism is leading to the utter ruin of the Jews of Eastern Europe."

In the early 1920s, Mussolini stated that Fascism would never raise a "Jewish Question" and in an article he wrote he stated "Italy knows no antisemitism and we believe that it will never know it", and then elaborated, "let us hope that Italian Jews will continue to be sensible enough so as not to give rise to antisemitism in the only country where it has never existed." In 1932, Mussolini during a conversation with Emil Ludwig described antisemitism as a "German vice" and stated that "There was 'no Jewish Question' in Italy and could not be one in a country with a healthy system of government." On several occasions, Mussolini spoke positively about Jews and the Zionist movement, although Fascism remained suspicious of Zionism after the Fascist Party gained power. In 1934, Mussolini supported the establishment of the Betar Naval Academy in Civitavecchia to train Zionist cadets under the direction of Ze'ev Jabotinsky, arguing that a Jewish state would be in Italy's interest.
Until 1938 Mussolini had denied any antisemitism within the Fascist Party.

The relationship between Mussolini and Adolf Hitler was a contentious one early on. While Hitler cited Mussolini as an influence and privately expressed great admiration for him, Mussolini had little regard for Hitler, especially after the Nazis had his friend and ally, Engelbert Dollfuss, the Austrofascist dictator of Austria, killed in 1934.

With the assassination of Dollfuss, Mussolini attempted to distance himself from Hitler by rejecting much of the racialism (particularly Nordicism) and antisemitism espoused by the Nazis. Mussolini during this period rejected biological racism, at least in the Nazi sense, and instead emphasized "Italianizing" the parts of the Italian Empire he had desired to build. He declared that the ideas of eugenics and the racially charged concept of an Aryan nation were not possible. Mussolini dismissed the idea of a master race as "arrant nonsense, stupid and idiotic".

When discussing the Nazi decree that the German people must carry a passport with either Aryan or Jewish racial affiliation marked on it, in 1934, Mussolini wondered how they would designate membership in the "Germanic race":

When German-Jewish journalist Emil Ludwig asked about his views on race in 1933, Mussolini exclaimed:

In a speech given in Bari in 1934, he reiterated his attitude towards the German ideology of Master race:

Though Italian Fascism varied its official positions on race from the 1920s to 1934, ideologically Italian Fascism did not originally discriminate against the Italian-Jewish community: Mussolini recognised that a small contingent had lived there "since the days of the Kings of Rome" and should "remain undisturbed". There were even some Jews in the National Fascist Party, such as Ettore Ovazza, who in 1935 founded the Jewish Fascist paper La Nostra Bandiera ("Our Flag").

By mid-1938, the enormous influence Hitler now had over Mussolini became clear with the introduction of the Manifesto of Race. The Manifesto, which was closely modeled on the Nazi Nuremberg Laws, stripped Jews of their Italian citizenship and with it any position in the government or professions. The racial laws declared Italians to be part of the Aryan race and forbid sexual relations and marriages between Italians and those considered to be of an "inferior race", chiefly Jews and Africans. Jews were not permitted to own or manage companies involved in military production, or factories that employed over one hundred people or exceeded a certain value. They could not own land over a certain value, serve in the armed forces, employ non-Jewish domestics, or belong to the Fascist party. Their employment in banks, insurance companies, and public schools was forbidden. While many historians have explained Mussolini's introduction of the Manifesto of Race as being purely a pragmatic move to gain favour with Italy's new ally, others have challenged that viewpoint and pointed out that Mussolini, along with other Fascist officials, had encouraged antisemitic sentiment well before 1938, such as in response to significant Jewish participation in Giustizia e Libertà, a highly prominent anti-Fascist organisation. Proponents of this viewpoint argue that Mussolini's implementation of these laws reflected a homegrown Italian flavour of antisemitism distinct from that of Nazism, one which perceived Jews as being bound to decadence and liberalism and was influenced not just by Fascist ideology but also by the Catholic Church.

Even after the introduction of the racial laws, Mussolini continued to make contradictory statements about race. Many high government officials told Jewish representatives that the antisemitism in Fascist Italy would soon be over. Antisemitism was unpopular within the Fascist party; once when a Fascist scholar protested to Mussolini about the treatment of his Jewish friends, Mussolini is reported to have said "I agree with you entirely. I don't believe a bit in the stupid anti-Semitic theory. I am carrying out my policy entirely for political reasons." Hitler was disappointed with Mussolini's perceived lack of antisemitism, as was Joseph Goebbels, who once said that "Mussolini appears to have not recognized the Jewish question". Nazi racial theorist Alfred Rosenberg criticised Fascist Italy for its lack of what he defined as a true concept of 'race' and 'Jewishness', while the virulently racist Julius Streicher, writing for the unofficial Nazi propaganda newspaper Der Stürmer, dismissed Mussolini as a Jewish puppet and lackey.

Mussolini and the Italian Army in occupied regions openly opposed German efforts to deport Italian Jews to Nazi concentration camps. Italy's refusal to comply with German demands of Jewish persecution influenced other countries.

In September 1943 semi-autonomous militarized squads of Fascist fanatics sprouted up throughout the Republic of Salò. These squads spread terror among Jews and partisans for a year and a half. In the power vacuum that existed during the first three or four months of the occupation, the semi-autonomous bands were virtually uncontrollable. Many were linked to individual high-ranking Fascist politicians. Italian Fascists, sometimes government employees but more often fanatic civilians or paramilitary volunteers, hastened to curry favor with the Nazis. Informers betrayed their neighbors, squadristi seized Jews and delivered them to the German SS, and Italian journalists seemed to compete in the virulence of their anti-Semitic diatribes.

It has been widely speculated that Mussolini adopted the Manifesto of Race in 1938 for merely tactical reasons, to strengthen Italy's relations with Germany. Mussolini and the Italian military did not consistently apply the laws adopted in the Manifesto of Race. In December 1943, Mussolini made a confession to journalist/politician Bruno Spampanato that seems to indicate that he regretted the Manifesto of Race:

Mussolini also reached out to the Muslims in his empire and in the predominantly Arab countries of the Middle East. In 1937, the Muslims of Libya presented Mussolini with the "Sword of Islam" while Fascist propaganda pronounced him as the "Protector of Islam".

Despite Mussolini's ostensible disbelief in biological racism, Fascist Italy implemented numerous laws rooted in such notions throughout its colonial empire on his orders as well as those of lower-ranking Fascist officials. Following the Second Italo-Senussi War, Mussolini directed Marshal Pietro Badoglio to ban miscegenation in Libya, fearing that Italian settlers in the colony would degenerate into "half-castes" if interracial relationships were permitted, as they were in neighboring Tunisia, then a French imperial possession. During the Second Italo-Ethiopian War and the ensuing Italian colonisation of Ethiopia, Mussolini implemented numerous laws mandating strict racial segregation between black Africans and Italians in Italian East Africa. These racist laws were much more rigorous and pervasive than those in other European colonies, in which racial segregation was generally more informal, and were instead comparable in scope and scale to those of South Africa during the Apartheid era, where laws dictated racial segregation down to the most mundane minutiae of society. Fascist Italy's segregationism further differed from that of other European colonies in that its impetus came not from within its colonies, as was usually the case, but from metropolitan Italy, specifically from Mussolini himself. Though many of these laws were ignored by local officials due to the difficulty of properly enforcing them, Mussolini frequently complained to subordinates upon hearing of instances of them being broken and saw the need to micromanage race relations as part of his ideological vision.

Legacy

Family 

Mussolini was survived by his wife, Rachele Mussolini, two sons, Vittorio and Romano Mussolini, and his daughters Edda (the widow of Count Ciano) and Anna Maria. A third son, Bruno, was killed in an air accident while flying a Piaggio P.108 bomber on a test mission, on 7 August 1941. His oldest son, Benito Albino Mussolini, from his marriage with Ida Dalser, was ordered to stop declaring that Mussolini was his father and in 1935 forcibly committed to an asylum in Milan, where he was murdered on 26 August 1942 after repeated coma-inducing injections. 

Alessandra Mussolini, granddaughter of Mussolini, is politically active in Italian right circles. She has been a member of the European Parliament for the far-right Social Alternative movement, a deputy in the Italian lower chamber and served in the Senate as a member of Silvio Berlusconi's Forza Italia party. Alessandra Mussolini is the daughter of Romano Mussolini (Benito Mussolini's fourth son), and of Anna Maria Scicolone, Sophia Loren's sister.

Neo-fascism 

Although the National Fascist Party was outlawed by the postwar Constitution of Italy, a number of successor neo-fascist parties emerged to carry on its legacy. Historically, the largest neo-fascist party was the Italian Social Movement (Movimento Sociale Italiano), which disbanded in 1995 and was replaced by National Alliance, a conservative party that distanced itself from Fascism (its founder, former foreign minister Gianfranco Fini, declared during an official visit to Israel that Fascism was "an absolute evil"). National Alliance and a number of neo-fascist parties were merged in 2009 to create the short-lived People of Freedom party led by then Prime Minister Silvio Berlusconi, which eventually disbanded after the defeat in the 2013 general election. In 2012, many former members of National Alliance joined Brothers of Italy, led by current Prime Minister of Italy, Giorgia Meloni.

Public image 
In February 2018, a poll conducted by the Demos & Pi research institute found that out of the total 1,014 people interviewed, 19% of voters across the Italian political spectrum had a "positive or very positive" opinion of Mussolini, 60% saw him negatively and 21% did not have an opinion.

Writings 

 Giovanni Hus, il Veridico (Jan Hus, True Prophet), Rome (1913). Published in America as John Hus (New York: Albert and Charles Boni, 1929). Republished by the Italian Book Co., NY (1939) as John Hus, the Veracious.
 The Cardinal's Mistress (trans. Hiram Motherwell, New York: Albert and Charles Boni, 1928).
 There is an essay on "The Doctrine of Fascism" written by Benito Mussolini that appeared in the 1932 edition of the Enciclopedia Italiana.
 La Mia Vita ("My Life"), Mussolini's autobiography written upon request of the American Ambassador in Rome (Child). Mussolini, at first not interested, decided to dictate the story of his life to Arnaldo Mussolini, his brother. The story covers the period up to 1929, includes Mussolini's personal thoughts on Italian politics and the reasons that motivated his new revolutionary idea. It covers the march on Rome and the beginning of the dictatorship and includes some of his most famous speeches in the Italian Parliament (Oct 1924, Jan 1925).
 Vita di Arnaldo (Life of Arnaldo), Milano, Il Popolo d'Italia, 1932.
 Scritti e discorsi di Benito Mussolini (Writings and Discourses of Mussolini), 12 volumes, Milano, Hoepli, 1934–1940.
 Four Speeches on the Corporate State, Laboremus, Roma, 1935, p. 38
 Parlo con Bruno (Talks with Bruno), Milano, Il Popolo d'Italia, 1941.
 Storia di un anno. Il tempo del bastone e della carota (History of a Year), Milano, Mondadori, 1944.
 From 1951 to 1962, Edoardo and Duilio Susmel worked for the publisher "La Fenice" to produce Opera Omnia (the complete works) of Mussolini in 35 volumes.

See also 

 Fascist syndicalism
 List of covers of Time magazine (1920s)
 Mediterraneanism
 Order of the Golden Spur
 Pact of Pacification

References

Bibliography 

 Bosworth, R.J.B. (2002). Mussolini. London, Hodder.
 Bosworth, R.J.B. (2006). Mussolini's Italy: Life Under the Dictatorship 1915–1945. London, Allen Lane.
 Caprotti, Federico (2007). Mussolini's Cities: Internal Colonialism in Italy, 1930–1939, Cambria Press.
 Celli, Carlo (2013). Economic Fascism: Primary Sources on Mussolini's Crony Capitalism. Axios Press.
 Corvaja, Santi (2001). Hitler and Mussolini: The Secret Meetings. Enigma. 
 Daldin, Rudolph S. The Last Centurion. http://www.benito-mussolini.com  
 
 
 
 
 
 
 
 
 Farrell, Nicholas (2003). Mussolini: A New Life. London: Phoenix Press, .
 Garibaldi, Luciano (2004). Mussolini: The Secrets of his Death. Enigma. 
 
 
 Hibbert, Christopher. Il Duce.
 
 
 
 Lowe, Norman. Italy, "1918–1945: the first appearance of fascism" in Mastering Modern World History.
 Morris, Terry; Murphy, Derrick. Europe 1870–1991.
 Moseley, Ray (2004). Mussolini: The Last 600 Days of Il Duce. Dallas: Taylor Trade Publishing.
 Mussolini, Rachele (1977) [1974]. Mussolini: An Intimate Biography. Pocket Books. Originally published by William Morrow, 
 O'Brien, Paul (2004). Mussolini in the First World War: The Journalist, the Soldier, the Fascist. Oxford: Berg Publishers.
 Painter, Jr., Borden W. (2005). Mussolini's Rome: Rebuilding the Eternal City.
 Passannanti, Erminia, Mussolini nel cinema italiano Passione, potere egemonico e censura della memoria. Un'analisi metastorica del film di Marco Bellocchio Vincere!, 2013. 
 Petacco, Arrigo, ed. (1998). L'archivio segreto di Mussolini. Mondadori. .
 Smith, Denis Mack (1982). Mussolini: A Biography, Borzoi Book published by Alfred A. Knopf, Inc. .
 
 
 
 
 Zuccotti, Susan (1987). Italians and the Holocaust Basic Books, Inc.

Historiography 
 O'Brien, Paul. 2004. Mussolini in the First World War: The Journalist, the Soldier, the Fascist. O'Brien evaluates the biographies in Italian and English in the Introduction.

Further reading 
 Hibbert, Christopher. Benito Mussolini, a Biography. (London: Reprint Society, [1962) p., ill. with b&w photos. online
 Kirkpatrick, Ivone, Sir. Mussolini, a study in power (1964) online
 Ridley, Jasper. Mussolini: A Biography (1998) online

External links 

 Did Mussolini really make the trains run on time?
 Benito Mussolini Speeches
 
 
 Il Duce 'sought Hitler ban' September 2003 BBC News
 Authorized translation of Mussolini's The Political and Social Doctrine of Fascism (1933)
 Maximilian Schönherr – Archiv Mussolini shaking hands with King George V. of the United Kingdom, 1923, The Illustrated London News, published 25 January 1936.
 Mussolini's Piazza Augusto Imperatore
 
 
 References to Mussolini in European newspapers – The European Library
 
 

|-

|-

 
1883 births
1945 deaths
20th-century atheists
20th-century Italian journalists
Annulled Honorary Knights Grand Cross of the Order of the Bath
Anti-Americanism
Anti-Masonry
Articles containing video clips
Bigamists
Colonialism
Critics of the Catholic Church
Deputies of Legislature XXV of the Kingdom of Italy
Deputies of Legislature XXVI of the Kingdom of Italy
Deputies of Legislature XXVII of the Kingdom of Italy
Deputies of Legislature XXVIII of the Kingdom of Italy
Deputies of Legislature XXIX of the Kingdom of Italy
Executed prime ministers
Fascist politicians
Fascist writers
Field marshals of Italy
Foreign ministers of Italy
Former Marxists
Genocide perpetrators
Grand Crosses of the Order of the Cross of Vytis
Heads of government who were later imprisoned
Historians of fascism
Italian anti-communists
Italian atheists
Italian duellists
Italian male journalists
Italian military personnel of World War I
Italian Ministers of the Interior
Italian nationalists
Italian newspaper founders
Italian people of World War II
Italian revolutionaries
Italian Socialist Party politicians
Knights of the Holy Sepulchre
Knights of Malta
Leaders ousted by a coup
Leaders who took power by coup
Members of the Chamber of Fasces and Corporations
Members of the Grand Council of Fascism
 
Benito
National syndicalists
People deported from Switzerland
People executed by Italy by firing squad
People from Predappio
People of the Italian Social Republic
Italian political party founders
Prime Ministers of Italy
Recipients of the Order of Lāčplēsis, 1st class
Recipients of the Order of the White Lion
Shooting survivors
World War II political leaders
Italy in World War II
Recipients of the Order of the White Eagle (Poland)
Grand Crosses of the Order of Saint-Charles
Holocaust perpetrators in Italy
20th-century Italian diplomats
20th-century Italian politicians
Executed mass murderers